The Cessna Citation Hemisphere was a business jet project by Cessna.
Announced in November 2015, it was then expected to fly in 2019 but its development was suspended in April 2018 due to a delay in the development of its Safran Silvercrest engines.
It was designed for Mach 0.9 and would have a  range.

Development

Announced at the 2015 National Business Aviation Association (NBAA) conference with the widest cabin in its class, it was expected to fly in 2019.

Although the Snecma Silvercrest was originally selected, the process was re-opened to the Pratt & Whitney Canada PW800.

The Silvercrest axial-centrifugal high-pressure compressor architecture is common below  but rare in its  range, and the pressure losses complexity at the final centrifugal stage made it slow to respond to commands in high altitude tests.
This made Dassault cancel its Silvercrest-powered Falcon 5X, but the Hemisphere business case depends on it as it could lead to the best fuel efficiency in the segment.
Textron is confident Safran can resolve the problems before the 2019 first flight.

In April 2018, development was suspended to see how Safran manage the Silvercrest problems before a decision on its continuation is made, or to defer it or to switch to another engine.
In May 2018, Safran announced it had launched a high-pressure compressor redesign for a go-ahead decision by the middle of 2019, after testing, shelving the Hemisphere program if problems cannot be fixed.
The redesigned compressor will be tested in July 2019 to prove the engine operation.

On October 15, 2018, fractional operator NetJets announced the purchase of up to 150 Hemispheres, priced at $35 million each, along 175 Citation Longitude, ordered for $26 million each.

In July 2019, Textron suspended the development as its Safran Silvercrest turbofans did not meet objectives. In October 2019, Textron reaffirmed that the project was still suspended, but not terminated.

Specifications

See also

References

Citation Hemisphere
Proposed aircraft of the United States
Twinjets
Low-wing aircraft
Hemisphere
T-tail aircraft